In convex analysis and the calculus of variations, both branches of mathematics, a pseudoconvex function is a function that behaves like a convex function with respect to finding its local minima, but need not actually be convex.  Informally, a differentiable function is pseudoconvex if it is increasing in any direction where it has a positive directional derivative. The property must hold in all of the function domain, and not only for nearby points.

Formal definition

Consider a differentiable function , defined on a (nonempty) convex open set  of the finite-dimensional Euclidean space . This function is said to be pseudoconvex if the following property holds:

Equivalently:

Properties

Relation to other types of "convexity" 

Every convex function is pseudoconvex, but the converse is not true. For example, the function  is pseudoconvex but not convex. Similarly, any pseudoconvex function is quasiconvex; but the converse is not true, since the function  is quasiconvex but not pseudoconvex. This can be summarized schematically as:

To see that  is not pseudoconvex, consider its derivative at : . Then, if  was pseudoconvex, we should have:

But it is not, as: .

Sufficient optimality condition 

Pseudoconvexity is of great interest in the area of optimization, because the converse is also true for any pseudoconvex function. Note also that the result guarantees a global minimum (not only local).

This last result is also true for a convex function, but it is not true for a quasiconvex function. Consider for example the quasiconvex function:

This function is not pseudoconvex, but it is quasiconvex.

Finally, note that a pseudoconvex function may not have any critical point. Take for example the pseudoconvex function: , whose derivative is always positive: .

Examples

An example of a function that is pseudoconvex, but not convex, is:  The figure shows this function for the case where . This example may be generalized to two variables as:

The previous example may be modified to obtain a function that is not convex, nor pseudoconvex, but is quasiconvex:

The figure shows this function for the case where .

Generalization to nondifferentiable functions

The notion of pseudoconvexity can be generalized to nondifferentiable functions as follows.

where u is any unit vector. The function is said to be pseudoconvex if it is increasing in any direction where the upper Dini derivative is positive. More precisely, this is characterized in terms of the subdifferential  as follows:

where  denotes the line segment adjoining x and y.

Related notions

A  is a function whose negative is pseudoconvex. A  is a function that is both pseudoconvex and pseudoconcave. For example, linear–fractional programs have pseudolinear objective functions and linear–inequality constraints. These properties allow fractional-linear problems to be solved by a variant of the simplex algorithm (of George B. Dantzig).

Given a vector-valued function , there is a more general notion of -pseudoconvexity and -pseudolinearity; wherein classical pseudoconvexity and pseudolinearity pertain to the case when .

See also
 Pseudoconvexity
 Convex function
 Quasiconvex function
 Invex function

Notes

References
 .
 .
 

Convex analysis
Convex optimization
Generalized convexity
Types of functions